Roccamorice is a town and comune in the province of Pescara, Abruzzo, central Italy.

Its distinctive shape is created by the imprint of the Lavino and Lanello rivers, both of which have dried up.

See also
Monte Morrone
Hermitage of San Bartolomeo in Legio
Hermitage of Santo Spirito a Majella

References